Trichostema laxum is a species of flowering plant in the mint family, known by the common name turpentine weed from the foliage's scent.<ref name=jepson>[http://herbaria4.herb.berkeley.edu/eflora_display.php?tid=46992 Jepson: Trichostema laxum']</ref>

Distribution
The annual plant is native to northern California and Oregon, at elevations below .  It is found primarily in the Inner Northern California Coast Ranges, including the subranges of the Klamath Mountains and the Mayacamas Mountains.

It grows in gravelly streambanks or sandy soil, of the mountains and foothills in chaparral, Foothill oak woodland, and Yellow pine forest habitats. The species has an affinity for serpentine soils.

DescriptionTrichostema laxum'' is an annual herb approaching  in maximum height.

Its aromatic foliage, with a strong turpentine odor, is coated in glandular and nonglandular hairs. The lanceolate to narrowly ovate leaves are up to 7 centimeters long.

The inflorescence is a series of clusters of flowers located at each leaf pair. Each flower has a hairy calyx of green or reddish sepals and a tubular, lipped purple corolla. The four stamens are long and curved, measuring up to 1.6 centimeters in length.

Its bloom period is from June to October.

References

External links
 Calflora: Trichostema laxum'' (Turpentine weed)
Jepson Manual eFlora (TJM2) treatment of Trichostema laxum
USDA Plants Profile for Trichostema laxum (turpentine weed)
UC Photos gallery: Trichostema laxum

laxum
Flora of California
Flora of Oregon
Natural history of the California chaparral and woodlands
Natural history of the California Coast Ranges
Flora of the Klamath Mountains
Mayacamas Mountains
Flora without expected TNC conservation status